Heritage Round may refer to:
AFL Heritage Round, of the Australian Football League (2003-2008)
NRL Heritage Round, of the National Rugby League (2008-2009)